King's Town Hyatt is a 35-story,  tall residential skyscraper located in Qianjin District, Kaohsiung, Taiwan. Construction of the skyscraper began in 2005 and it was completed in 2009. Designed by the Hong Kong based architectural firm P&T Group, the residential building provides 174 units of luxury apartments, with facilities such as a swimming pool, banquet hall, fitness center and a sky lounge on its topmost floor. As of December 2021, it is the 23rd tallest building in Kaohsiung.

See also 
 List of tallest buildings in Taiwan
 List of tallest buildings in Kaohsiung
 Kingtown King Park

References

2009 establishments in Taiwan
Residential skyscrapers in Taiwan
Skyscrapers in Kaohsiung
Apartment buildings in Taiwan
Residential buildings completed in 2009
Neoclassical architecture in Taiwan